The African Research Universities Alliance (ARUA) is an alliance of 16 research universities in Africa. Founded in March 2015 in Dakar, Senegal, ARUA seeks to enhance research and graduate training among its member universities through various avenues, including the establishment up of Centres of Excellence (CoEs) across member institutions. The UK Research and Innovation provided significant funding to support the establishment of the ARUA CoEs.

ARUA's approach is hinged on the approach of working together.  ARUA, therefore, brings together peer African universities that are willing to collaborate by pooling their limited resources to generate a critical mass that can more effectively support their limited but growing numbers of researchers. ARUA's efforts are, therefore, centred on four main thrusts - Collaborative research, Training and support for PhDs, Capacity building for research management, Research Advocacy.

History 

The alliance was launched in Dakar, Senegal by fifteen (15) universities in March 2015. These universities included the universities of Lagos, Ibadan and Obafemi Awolowo in Nigeria, the University of Ghana, Makerere University in Uganda, the University of Nairobi in Kenya, the University of Dar es Salaam in Tanzania, the National University of Rwanda, Université Cheikh Anta Diop in Senegal, and in South Africa the universities of the Witwatersrand, Cape Town, Stellenbosch, Pretoria, KwaZulu-Natal and Rhodes. Five (5) of these universities had participated in the Higher Education Research and Advocacy Network in Africa (HERANA) project and thus found commonalities that formed the basis for forming the ARUA network. Carnegie Corporation of New York were instrumental in the initiative.

Governance 

The governance of ARUA is led by a Board which comprises the Vice Chancellors of all the member universities. The functions of the Board and its authority are derived from the Alliance's constitution. The Board has a Chair and a Co-Chair who are elected every three years.  The Board is assisted in its work by the Executive Committee, which is a subset of the Board. The management of the Alliance is done through its Secretary-General.

The ARUA Board is currently chaired by Prof. Barnabas Nawangwe and Prof. Sizwe Mabizela. The Secretariat is headed by Prof. Ernest Aryeetey, who has been Secretary-General since the Alliance's inauguration in 2015.

Membership 

ARUA's membership remains strictly by invitation from its Board. Currently, the Alliance has 15 members universities and one (1) associate member. The membership is as follows:

 Addis Ababa University
 University of Lagos
 University of Ibadan
 University of Ghana
 University of Dar es Salaam
 University of Nairobi
 Université Cheikh Anta Diop
 Makerere University
 University of Rwanda
 University of Witwatersrand
 University of Pretoria
 Stellenbosch University
 Rhodes University
 University of Cape Town
 University of KwaZulu-Natal
 University of Mauritius (Associate Member)

Partnerships and Collaborations 

ARUA since its inception has fostered a growing number of partnerships and collaborations with funding institutions such as the Andrew Mellon Foundation, the National Research Foundation, the UK Research and Innovation, Carnegie Corporation of New York, Kresge Foundation, Clarivate Analytics. The Alliance has singed MoUs with the Association of Commonwealth Universities (ACU), the University of Glasgow and the Guild of Research-Intensive European Universities.

References 

Organisations based in Dakar
Consortia